Bocage’s tree frog (Leptopelis bocagii) is a species of frog in the family Arthroleptidae. It is found in Angola, Burundi, Cameroon, Democratic Republic of the Congo, Ethiopia, Kenya, Namibia, Rwanda, Tanzania, Zambia, and Zimbabwe, and possibly Botswana, Central African Republic,  Chad,  Malawi,  Mozambique,  Nigeria,  Sudan, and Uganda.

Description
The upper parts are brown, with a darker brown patch on the back which may extend onto the head, or a dark M or N shaped blotch on the back. The digits are largely unwebbed and have reduced or no discs. The juvenile has a green or greenish-brown back.

Distribution and habitat
Bocage’s tree frog is very similar in appearance to the Lake Upemba forest tree frog (Leptopelis parbocagii) and they are probably part of a species complex. Their ranges overlap, but Bocage’s tree frog has a larger range, extending from Ethiopia southwards to Namibia and Zambia. Its typical habitat is grassland and savannah, both wet and dry.

Ecology
Bocage’s tree frog is a ground-dwelling and largely burrowing species and thus easily overlooked outside the breeding season. The call of the male, usually uttered from the ground or occasionally from low vegetation, is an atonal "waaab", sometimes repeated immediately. It breeds in temporary pools in the rainy season, the eggs being laid in a hole in the ground near the water's edge.

Status
Bocage’s tree frog is a common species with a wide range and a presumed large total population, is able to adapt to habitats disturbed by man and faces no particular threats. For these reasons, the International Union for Conservation of Nature has assessed its conservation status as being of "least concern".

References

bocagii
Frogs of Africa
Amphibians of Angola
Amphibians of Burundi
Amphibians of the Democratic Republic of the Congo
Amphibians of Ethiopia
Amphibians of Kenya
Amphibians of Malawi
Amphibians of Namibia
Amphibians of Rwanda
Amphibians of Tanzania
Amphibians of Zambia
Amphibians of Zimbabwe
Amphibians described in 1865
Taxa named by Albert Günther
Taxonomy articles created by Polbot